Portugal originally planned to participate in the Eurovision Song Contest 2020 with the song "" written by Marta Carvalho. The song was performed by Elisa. The Portuguese broadcaster  (RTP) organised the national final  in order to select the Portuguese entry for the 2020 contest in Rotterdam, Netherlands. After two semi-finals and a final which took place in February and March 2020, "" performed by Elisa emerged as the winner after achieving the highest score following the combination of votes from seven regional juries and a public televote.

Portugal was drawn to compete in the second semi-final of the Eurovision Song Contest which took place on 14 May 2020. However, the contest was cancelled due to the COVID-19 pandemic.

Background 
Prior to the 2020 contest, Portugal had participated in the Eurovision Song Contest fifty-one times since its first entry in 1964. Portugal had won the contest on one occasion: in 2017 with the song "" performed by Salvador Sobral. Following the introduction of semi-finals for the 2004, Portugal had featured in only five finals. Portugal's least successful result has been last place, which they have achieved on four occasions, most recently in 2018 with the song "" performed by Cláudia Pascoal. Portugal has also received  on two occasions; in 1964 and 1997. The nation failed to qualify to the final in 2019 with the song "" performed by Conan Osíris.

The Portuguese national broadcaster,  (RTP), broadcasts the event within Portugal and organises the selection process for the nation's entry. RTP confirmed Portugal's participation in the 2020 Eurovision Song Contest on 19 August 2019. The broadcaster has traditionally selected the Portuguese entry for the Eurovision Song Contest via the music competition , with exceptions in 1988 and 2005 when the Portuguese entries were internally selected.

Before Eurovision

Festival da Canção 2020 

 was the 54th edition of  that selected Portugal's entry for the Eurovision Song Contest 2020. Sixteen entries competed in the competition that consisted of two semi-finals held on 22 and 29 February 2020 leading to an eight-song final on 7 March 2020. The shows were also broadcast on RTP Acessibilidades with presentation in Portuguese Sign Language.

Format 
The format of the competition consisted of three shows: two semi-finals on 22 and 29 February 2020 and the final on 7 March 2020. Each semi-final featured eight competing entries from which four advanced from each show to complete the eight song lineup in the final. Results during the semi-finals were determined by the 50/50 combination of votes from a jury panel appointed by RTP and public televoting, while results during the final were determined by the 50/50 combination of votes from seven regional juries and public televoting, which was opened following the second semi-final and closed during the final show. Both the public televote and the juries assigned points from 3-8, 10 and 12 based on the ranking developed by both streams of voting.

Format 
Sixteen composers were selected by RTP through three methods: fourteen invited by RTP for the competition, one selected from 320 submissions received through an open call for songs and one selected from the  radio show MasterClass featuring composers without any published work. The composers, which both created the songs and selected its performers, were required to submit the demo and final versions of their entries by 31 October and 31 November 2019, respectively. Songs could be submitted in any language other than Portuguese. The selected composers were revealed on 7 November 2019, while the competing artists were revealed on 15 January 2020.

Shows

Semi-finals
The two semi-finals took place at RTP's Studio 1 in Lisbon on 22 and 29 February 2020. The first semi-final was hosted by Jorge Gabriel and Tânia Ribas de Oliveira while the second semi-final was hosted by José Carlos Malato and Sónia Araújo. In each semi-final eight entries competed and four advanced to the final based on the 50/50 combination of votes of a jury panel consisting of Anabela, Capicua, Conan Osíris, Héber Marques, Isilda Sanches, Miguel Ângelo and Rui Miguel Abreu, and a public televote.

Final
The final took place at the Coliseu Comendador Rondão Almeida in Elvas on 7 March 2020, hosted by Filomena Cautela and Vasco Palmeirim. The eight entries that qualified from the two preceding semi-finals competed and the winner, "Medo de sentir" performed by Elisa, was selected based on the 50/50 combination of votes of seven regional juries and a public televote. In addition to the performances of the competing entries, Portuguese Eurovision 2019 entrant Conan Osíris, Joana Espadinha, Lena d'Água, NBC, Samuel Úria together with Alex D'Alva Teixeira, and Surma performed as the interval acts.

At Eurovision 
According to Eurovision rules, all nations with the exceptions of the host country and the "Big Five" (France, Germany, Italy, Spain and the United Kingdom) are required to qualify from one of two semi-finals in order to compete for the final; the top ten countries from each semi-final progress to the final. The European Broadcasting Union (EBU) split up the competing countries into six different pots based on voting patterns from previous contests, with countries with favourable voting histories put into the same pot. On 28 January 2020, a special allocation draw was held which placed each country into one of the two semi-finals, as well as which half of the show they would perform in. Portugal was placed into the second semi-final, to be held on 14 May 2020, and was scheduled to perform in the second half of the show. However, due to 2019-20 pandemic of Coronavirus, the contest was cancelled.

During the Eurovision Song Celebration YouTube broadcast in place of the semi-finals, it was revealed that Portugal was set to perform in position 15, following the entry from Armenia and before the entry from Georgia.

References

External links
 Official Festival da Canção site

2020
Countries in the Eurovision Song Contest 2020
Eurovision